INTRALOT is a Greek company that supplies integrated gambling, transaction processing systems, game content, sports betting management and interactive gambling services, to state-licensed gaming organizations worldwide. The company acts both as a lottery vendor and a lottery operator. It has a presence in 53 countries and a workforce of approximately 5,400 people It is a publicly listed company in the Athens Stock Exchange.

History
INTRALOT originated as a spin-off of the Intracom group, owned by the Greek billionaire Sokratis Kokkalis. It originally provided infrastructure for the Greek National Lottery (OPAP), under a 1999 contract, but has since expanded its operations into a worldwide market. Intralot's games library includes a variety of games such as numerical games, TV lottery games, sports lotteries, fixed odds betting, instant lotteries, pari-mutuel, video lottery and monitor games.

In December 2009, Intralot announced purchasing 35% of the American online games provider CyberArts, purposing to expand its subsidiary company, Intralot Interactive (I2). In October 2011, Intralot concluded the sale of its minority stake in CyberArts, as per the Group's decision not to exercise the option to increase its participation to 51% and focus on its own technology and services. During ICE Totally Gaming 2015 the company announced that it will acquire a stake of 25% of Bit8.

In December 2017, Intralot completed its acquisition of Bit8, enabling its digital transformation strategy for lottery modernisation.

Activities
In May 2008, INTRALOT was implicated in the criminal investigation of Romanian Politician Christian Boureanu for "abuse of office against the public interest" by the National Anticorruption Directorate for Boureanu's role in signing a contract in 2000 between Loteria Română and Intracom SA Hellenic Telecommunication Electronics Industry (Intralot Integrated Lottery Systems and Services) that caused Loteria Română to incur losses of over €120 million.

Operations
In December 2016, INTRALOT signed a long-term contract with Idaho Lottery in the US, that will come into force in October 2017 and last until October 2027, extendable by up to two additional five-year periods..

In February 2018, Intralot announced that they had agreed a 10-year deal worth an estimated $340 million with the Illinois State Lottery. The deal will cover the installation of technology solutions in over 7,500 retail locations across the US state.

In February 2019, the D.C. Council authorized a sole-source contract for sports betting throughout Washington D.C. Intralot, who runs the lottery within the district, will manage and provide services for the online sports betting component within D.C.

This deal was temporarily blocked in September 2019 when an injunction was issued against the sole-source sports betting lottery contract with Intralot. One month later, the injunction was tossed aside by the judge and the contract was allowed to move forward.

In early 2019, Intralot's joint venture with Inteltek lost a contract to control the Iddaa national sports betting monopoly to a consortium supported by Scientific Games.

Membership and recognition
INTRALOT is a member of international gaming associations, including the  World Lottery Association (WLA), European Lotteries (EL), the North American Association of State & Provincial Lotteries (NASPL) and CIBELAE (the Hispanic association that covers S. America and the Iberian peninsula), as well as the Gaming Standards Association (GSA) in the US and the Asia Pacific Lottery Association (APLA).

INTRALOT was named one of the World Economic Forum's "New Champions", as it was listed in its "Global Growth Companies Community" in 2007.

INTRALOT received a "Global IT Excellence Award 2008"
by the World Information Technology and Services Alliance (WITSA) during its
16th World Congress on Information Technology (WCIT 2008), Kuala Lumpur, Malaysia.

INTRALOT is a member of the Ηellenic Network of Corporate Social Responsibility which is a National Partner Organization of (CSR-Europe), and promotes the adoption of business practices in line with concepts of social responsibility and cohesion. INTRALOT is a member of the United Nations "Global Compact Network" for Corporate Social Responsibility.

Betting Company, a subsidiary of Intralot that operated sports betting in 12 countries, signed a cooperation agreement with FIFA's Early Warning System for the protection of the integrity of football.

References

Entertainment companies of Greece
Companies listed on the Athens Exchange
Gambling companies of Greece
Companies based in Athens
Gambling companies established in 1992
Greek brands
Intracom Group